Branko Davidović (born 3 September 1959) is a retired Serbian football player.

Club career
Born in Sremska Mitrovica, SR Serbia, Branko Davidović played for Yugoslav First League teams such as NK Maribor and NK Osijek before joining Red Star Belgrade.

Veracruz sporting director Bora Milutinović signed Davidović days before the start of the 1989–90 Mexican Primera División season. He made only seven appearances for the club.

References

External sources
stats

Living people
1959 births
Sportspeople from Sremska Mitrovica
Serbian footballers
Yugoslav footballers
NK Maribor players
NK Osijek players
Red Star Belgrade footballers
Yugoslav First League players
C.D. Veracruz footballers
Liga MX players
Serbian expatriate footballers
Expatriate footballers in Mexico

Association football goalkeepers